The Winnifred Street Bridge (also known as WSDOT Bridge No. 1130) is a concrete box girder bridge in Ruston, Washington. It was built in 1941 by S. R. Gray.

After an inspection of the bridge, it was found to have structural deficiencies in its abutment wall, and was closed for repairs. The original guardrails were replaced, as well as the deck surface. In June 2003, the bridge reopened to traffic.

The bridge was added to the National Register of Historic Places in 1995.

References

Sources
 

National Register of Historic Places in Pierce County, Washington
Road bridges on the National Register of Historic Places in Washington (state)
Bridges completed in 1941
Bridges in Pierce County, Washington
Concrete bridges in the United States
Box girder bridges in the United States